SS John Philip Sousa was a Liberty ship built in the United States during World War II. She was named after John Philip Sousa, an American composer and conductor of the late Romantic era known primarily for American military marches.

Construction
John Philip Sousa was laid down on 29 March 1943, under a Maritime Commission (MARCOM) contract, MC hull 1200, by the St. Johns River Shipbuilding Company, Jacksonville, Florida; she was sponsored by Mrs. Kenneth A. Merrill, the wife of the vice president of the St. Johns River SB Co., she was launched on 4 July 1943.

History
She was allocated to Wessel Duval & Company on 6 August 1943. On 6 June 1946, she was placed in the Hudson River Reserve Fleet, Jones Point, New York. She was sold for commercial use, on 15 October 1946, to Compania Internacional de Vapores, and renamed Erato. She was withdrawn from the fleet, 1 November 1946. On 30 September 1965, while operating as Protostatis, she ran aground in Lake Ontario and suffered extensive damage. After being refloated, she again ran aground on Wolfe Island, at the mouth of the St. Lawrence River, while being towed to Montreal, on 16 November 1965. She was declared a constructive total loss (CTL) and scrapped in 1966.

The bell from the ship is still used by the United States Marine Band, particularly in Sousa's piece, The Liberty Bell.

References

Bibliography

 
 
 
 

 

Liberty ships
Ships built in Jacksonville, Florida
1943 ships
Hudson River Reserve Fleet
Maritime incidents in 1965